"Too Late" is a song by American rock band Dead by Sunrise, which consists of Linkin Park lead singer Chester Bennington, as well as the band members of Julien-K. It is the fourth of their debut album, Out of Ashes.

Background
The song consists of electronic elements.

In a recent article from Ultimate Guitar Archive, the single has been described as "another one of the favorite songs from Out of Ashes, which is beautiful and meaningful throughout with another reverb based song with more guitar parts that are mellow and used in the song, still managing to sound excellent." In another article from Sputnik Music, the song has been described as "it showcases Bennington's softer and melodic tone that's been explored with decent results."

Track listing

Charts

References

External links

2009 songs
Dead by Sunrise songs
Warner Records singles
Songs written by Chester Bennington
Song recordings produced by Howard Benson